Estonia participated in the Eurovision Song Contest 2017 with the song "Verona" written by Sven Lõhmus. The song was performed by Koit Toome, who had previously represented Estonia in the Eurovision Song Contest in 1998 where he placed twelfth with the song "Mere lapsed", and Laura, who had previously represented Estonia in the Eurovision Song Contest in 2005 as part of the group Suntribe where she failed to qualify to the final with the song "Let's Get Loud". The Estonian broadcaster Eesti Rahvusringhääling (ERR) organised the national final Eesti Laul 2017 in order to select the Estonian entry for the 2017 contest in Kyiv, Ukraine. The national final consisted of three shows: two semi-finals and a final. Ten songs competed in each semi-final and the top five from each semi-final as determined by a jury panel and public vote qualified to the final. In the final, the winner was selected over two rounds of voting. In the first round, a jury panel and a public vote selected the top three to qualify to the super final. In the super final, "Verona" performed by Koit Toome and Laura was selected as the winner entirely by a public vote.

Estonia was drawn to compete in the second semi-final of the Eurovision Song Contest which took place on 11 May 2017. Performing during the show in position 17, "Verona" was not announced among the top 10 entries of the second semi-final and therefore did not qualify to compete in the final. It was later revealed that Estonia placed fourteenth out of the 18 participating countries in the semi-final with 85 points.

Background 

In 2016, "Play" performed by Jüri Pootsmann failed to qualify Estonia to the final where the song placed eighteenth (last) in the semi-final.

The Estonian national broadcaster, Eesti Rahvusringhääling (ERR), broadcasts the event within Estonia and organises the selection process for the nation's entry. ERR confirmed Estonia's participation at the 2017 Eurovision Song Contest on 12 April 2016. Since their debut, the Estonian broadcaster has organised national finals that feature a competition among multiple artists and songs in order to select Estonia's entry for the Eurovision Song Contest. The Eesti Laul competition has been organised since 2009 in order to select Estonia's entry and on 6 September 2016, ERR announced the organisation of Eesti Laul 2017 in order to select the nation's 2017 entry.

Before Eurovision

Eesti Laul 2017 
Eesti Laul 2017 was the eighth edition of the Estonian national selection Eesti Laul, which selected Estonia's entry for the Eurovision Song Contest 2017. The competition consisted of twenty entries competing in two semi-finals on 11 and 18 February 2017 leading to a ten-song final on 4 March 2017. All three shows were broadcast on Eesti Televisioon (ETV) and on ETV+ with Russian commentary as well as streamed online at the broadcaster's official website err.ee. The final was also broadcast via radio on Raadio 2 with commentary by Margus Kamlat, Erik Morna, Kristo Rajasaare and Karl-Andreas Kalmet.

Format 
The format of the competition included two semi-finals on 11 and 18 February 2017 and a final on 4 March 2017. Ten songs competed in each semi-final and the top five from each semi-final qualified to complete the ten song lineup in the final. The results of the semi-finals was determined by the 50/50 combination of votes from a professional jury and public televoting for the first four qualifiers and a second round of public televoting for the fifth qualifier. The winning song in the final was selected over two rounds of voting: the first round results selected the top three songs via the 50/50 combination of jury and public voting, while the second round (superfinal) determined the winner solely by public televoting. In addition to winning the right to represent Estonia at the 2017 Eurovision Song Contest, the winning songwriters were also awarded monetary prizes of €3,000. The Estonian Authors' Society and Estonian Performers Association also awarded a monetary prize of €1,000 to the top three entries.

Competing entries 
On 6 September 2016, ERR opened the submission period for artists and composers to submit their entries up until 1 November 2016. All artists and composers were required to have Estonian citizenship or be a permanent resident of Estonia and each artist and songwriter was only able to submit a maximum of three entries with an exception for composers who participated in songwriting camps organised by the Estonian Song Academy in spring and autumn 2016. Foreign collaborations were allowed as long as 50% of the songwriters were Estonian. A record 242 submissions were received by the deadline—breaking the previous record of 238, set during the 2016 edition. An 11-member jury panel selected 20 semi-finalists from the submissions and the selected songs were announced during the ETV entertainment program Ringvaade on 8 November 2016. The selection jury consisted of Andres Puusepp (DJ), Erik Morna (Raadio 2 head of music), Harri Hakanen (Uuden Musiikin Kilpailu music manager), Ingrid Kohtla (music editor), Kaidi Klein (screenwriter), Kristel Aaslaid (musician), Olavi Paide (producer), Owe Petersell (Raadio Elmar chief editor), Piret Järvis (ERR journalist), Siim Nestor (music critic) and Toomas Puna (Raadio Sky+ program director).

Among the competing artists were previous Eurovision Song Contest entrants Ivo Linna, who represented Estonia in 1996 with Maarja-Liis Ilus, Koit Toome, who represented Estonia in 1998, Laura, who represented Estonia in 2005 as part of the group Suntribe, Lenna Kuurmaa, who represented Switzerland in 2005 as member of the band Vanilla Ninja, and Elina Born, who represented Estonia in 2015 with Stig Rästa who also co-wrote her entry. Daniel Levi, Liis Lemsalu and Rasmus Rändvee have all competed in previous editions of Eesti Laul.

Semi-finals 
Two semi-finals took place on 11 and 18 February 2017, hosted by Ott Sepp and Märt Avandi. The live portion of the show was held at the ERR studios in Tallinn where the artists awaited the results while their performances, which were filmed earlier at the ERR studios between 2 and 5 February 2017, were screened. In each semi-final ten songs competed for the first four spots in the final with the outcome decided upon by the combination of the votes from a jury panel and a public televote, with the fifth qualifier decided by an additional televote between the remaining non-qualifiers.  The jury panel that voted in the semi-finals consisted of Metsakutsu, Kadri Voorand, Niko Nykänen, Eva Palm, Jüri Pihel, Maia Vahtramäe, Sten Teppan, Aleksandr Žedeljov, Ingrid Kohtla, Meisterjaan and Allan Roosileht.

Final 
The final took place on 4 March 2017 at the Saku Suurhall in Tallinn, hosted by Ott Sepp and Märt Avandi. The five entries that qualified from each of the two preceding semi-finals, all together ten songs, competed during the show. The winner was selected over two rounds of voting. In the first round, a jury (50%) and public televote (50%) determined the top three entries to proceed to the superfinal. The public vote in the first round registered 100,578 votes. In the superfinal, "Verona" performed by Koit Toome & Laura was selected as the winner entirely by a public televote. The public televote in the superfinal registered 72,518 votes. In addition to the performances of the competing entries, Jüri Pootsmann, who represented Estonia in the Eurovision Song Contest 2016, Swedish singer Måns Zelmerlöw, who won the Eurovision Song Contest 2015, and the band Beyond Beyond performed as the interval acts. The jury panel that voted in the first round of the final consisted of Måns Zelmerlöw (singer), Toomas Edur (ballet dancer), Julia Bali (Raadio 4 chief editor), Harri Hakanen (Uuden Musiikin Kilpailu music manager), Marju Länik (singer), Valner Valme (music critic), Henry Kõrvits (musician), Siim Nestor (music critic), Piret Krumm (actress), Alon Amir (music manager) and Poli Genova (singer).

At Eurovision 

According to Eurovision rules, all nations with the exceptions of the host country and the "Big Five" (France, Germany, Italy, Spain and the United Kingdom) are required to qualify from one of two semi-finals in order to compete for the final; the top ten countries from each semi-final progress to the final. The European Broadcasting Union (EBU) split up the competing countries into six different pots based on voting patterns from previous contests, with countries with favourable voting histories put into the same pot. On 31 January 2017, a special allocation draw was held which placed each country into one of the two semi-finals, as well as which half of the show they would perform in. Estonia was placed into the second semi-final, to be held on 11 May 2017, and was scheduled to perform in the second half of the show.

Once all the competing songs for the 2017 contest had been released, the running order for the semi-finals was decided by the shows' producers rather than through another draw, so that similar songs were not placed next to each other. Estonia was set to perform in position 18, following the entry from Lithuania and before the entry from Israel. However, following Russia's disqualification from the contest on 13 April and subsequent removal from the running order of the second semi-final, Estonia's performing position shifted to 17.

The two semi-finals and the final were broadcast in Estonia on ETV with commentary in Estonian by Marko Reikop and on ETV+ with commentary in Russian by Julia Kalenda and Aleksandr Hobotov. The first semi-final and final were also broadcast via radio on Raadio 2 with Estonian commentary by Mart Juur and Andrus Kivirähk. The Estonian spokesperson, who announced the top 12-point score awarded by the Estonian jury during the final, was Jüri Pootsmann who had previously represented Estonia in the Eurovision Song Contest in 2016.

Semi-final 

Koit Toome and Laura took part in technical rehearsals on 3 and 6 May, followed by dress rehearsals on 10 and 11 May. This included the jury show on 10 May where the professional juries of each country watched and voted on the competing entries.

The Estonian performance featured Koit Toome in a black suit with sequin embellishments and Laura in a white dress performing on stage which displayed black and white colours and holograms of Toome and Laura appearing on the LED screens, with a light-up pathway on the LED floor accompanying Toome's entrance to the stage. Koit Toome and Laura were joined by three backing vocalists: Dagmar Oja, Kaire Vilgats and Rolf Roosalu.

At the end of the show, Estonia was not announced among the top 10 entries in the second semi-final and therefore failed to qualify to compete in the final. It was later revealed that Estonia placed 14th in the semi-final, receiving a total of 85 points: 69 points from the televoting and 16 points from the juries.

Voting 
Voting during the three shows involved each country awarding two sets of points from 1-8, 10 and 12: one from their professional jury and the other from televoting. Each nation's jury consisted of five music industry professionals who are citizens of the country they represent, with their names published before the contest to ensure transparency. This jury judged each entry based on: vocal capacity; the stage performance; the song's composition and originality; and the overall impression by the act. In addition, no member of a national jury was permitted to be related in any way to any of the competing acts in such a way that they cannot vote impartially and independently. The individual rankings of each jury member as well as the nation's televoting results were released shortly after the grand final.

Below is a breakdown of points awarded to Estonia and awarded by Estonia in the second semi-final and grand final of the contest, and the breakdown of the jury voting and televoting conducted during the two shows:

Points awarded to Estonia

Points awarded by Estonia

Detailed voting results
The following members comprised the Estonian jury:
 Olavi Paide (jury chairperson)TV producer
 Rasmus Rändveesinger
 Getter Jaanisinger, represented Estonia in the 2011 contest
 singer
 Marju Läniksinger

References

External links 

2017
Countries in the Eurovision Song Contest 2017
Eurovision